Oleksiy Zozulya (born 15 April 1992) is a professional Ukrainian football defender who plays for Kolos Kovalivka in the Ukrainian Premier League.

Zozulya is the product of the FC Dynamo Kyiv School System. He signed a contract with the Ukrainian Premier League club FC Metalurh Zaporizhzhia, but did not appear for the main team. In March 2012 he signed a deal with the Ukrainian First League club FC Poltava.

References

External links
 
 

1992 births
Living people
Footballers from Kyiv
Ukrainian footballers
Ukraine student international footballers
Ukraine under-21 international footballers
FC Poltava players
FC Karlivka players
FC Metalurh-2 Zaporizhzhia players
FC Hoverla Uzhhorod players
NK Veres Rivne players
FC Kolos Kovalivka players
FC Lviv players
Ukrainian Premier League players
Ukrainian First League players
Ukrainian Second League players
Association football defenders